The Marrago were an Aboriginal Australian people of the state of the Cape York Peninsula in northern Queensland. They may have been a subgroup of the Mayi-Kutuna.

Country
Little is known of the details of the Marrago domain, which was in western Queensland, but Norman Tindale calculated, by default, that their tribal lands covered roughly  around the area of the Alexandra River.

Gavan Breen (1981) thought that they might have been a sub-group of the Mayi Kutuna people; Paul Memmott (1994) lists their language but gives no further detail. Their status is unconfirmed by the AIATSIS collection.

Alternative names
 Ngarra
 Nga:rago.(?)

Notes

Citations

Sources

Aboriginal peoples of Queensland
Far North Queensland